Annona spraguei is a species of plant in the Annonaceae family. It is endemic to Panama.  It is threatened by habitat loss. Its pollen is shed as permanent tetrads.

References

Flora of Panama
spraguei
Vulnerable plants
Taxonomy articles created by Polbot